The Purus were a Rigvedic tribe or a confederation of tribes c. 1700–1400 BC. There were several factions of Purus, one being the Bharatas. The Purus and the Bharatas were the two most prominent tribes in most of the Rigveda. The Purus rallied many other groups against King Sudas of the Bharata, but were defeated in the Battle of the Ten Kings (RV 7.18, etc.).

Etymology 
The name Puru is of possible Indo-Aryan origin.

Rigveda 
In Mandala 6, it is recalled that Purukutsa, chieftain of Purus, had destroyed autumnal forts in the Afghan mountains. In Mandala 4, it is stated that as a result of his Ashvamedha (Horse Sacrifice) with the horse Daurgaha, his son Trasadasyu was born.

In Mandala 4, Trasadasyu is the chieftain of the Purus. In addition to being the son of Purukutsa, Trasadasyu is also described as Gairikṣita, meaning descendant of Girikṣit. Trasadasyu lived on the western side of the Indus River (Sindhu) while Mandala 4 was being composed, but he also moved into the land of Seven Rivers and defeated the Anu-Druhyus and Yadu-Turvashas. He molded the conquered tribes and the Purus into the Pancha-janah (Five Peoples). To celebrate his victory he conducted an Ashvamedha with his horse, Dadhrikā. Dadhrikā is extolled in RV 4.38-40, and in these hymns, Dadhrikā is stated to have become a divine being, the sacrificial horse of the Ashvamedha, and a symbol of Puru and Indo-Aryan dominance. Trasadasyu's son was Tṛkṣi.

Scholars who adhere to Hermann Grassmann's interpretation of Rigveda 7.92.2 state that by Mandala 7, the Purus had reached the Sarasvati river.

Claimants 
Later rulers may have claimed lineage to the Puru clan to bolster their legitimacy. Modern scholars conjecture that Porus may have been a Puru king. However, Porus is not known in Indian sources.

See also 
 List of Indian monarchs

Notes

References 
 
 

Rigvedic tribes
Indo-Aryan peoples